I'll Come Running may refer to:

 "I'll Come Running", a 1977 Livingston Taylor song on his album Three Way Mirror
 "I'll Come Running", a 1975 Brian Eno song on his album Another Green World
 "I'll Come Runnin'" (Connie Smith song), a 1967 country song by Connie Smith
 "I'll Come Running" (Neil Diamond song), a 1967 song written by Neil Diamond

See also
 "I'll Come Running Back to You", a 1957 song by Sam Cooke